Bedri Omuri (born 16 January 1957 in Albania), nicknamed Bedrana by the SK Tirana fans during the 1980s, is an Albanian retired footballer.

Club career
The midfielder spent most of his playing career at 17 Nëntori Tirana, making his debut against Lokomotiva Durrës in January 1977 and winning 8 domestic trophies. He also had two seasons at
Besëlidhja Lezhë.

International career
He made his debut for Albania in a September 1982 European Championship qualification match away at Austria and earned a total of 14 caps, scoring 3 goals. His final international was an April 1987 European Championship qualification match, also against Austria.

Personal life
After retiring as a player, Omuri worked as a coach with all different age groups at KF Tirana and also worked as a physical education teacher at schools and for Tirana municipality.

Honours
Nëntori Tirana
Albanian Superliga: 1981–82, 1984–85, 1987–88, 1988–89
Albanian Cup: 1977, 1983, 1984, 1986

References

External links

 

1957 births
Living people
Footballers from Tirana
Albanian footballers
Association football midfielders
Albania international footballers
KF Tirana players
Besëlidhja Lezhë players
Kategoria Superiore players